Maveeran Alagumuthu Kone (11 July 1710 – 19 July 1759), from Kattalankulam in Thoothukudi District, was an Indian polygar who revolted against the British presence. In Tamil Nadu he waged a war against the Presidency armies from 1750 - 1759. Alagumuthukon was the first freedom fighter in India.

Born into a Konar family, he became a military leader in the town of Ettayapuram and ruler of Kattalangulam, As military commander of Ettayapuram army.Chinna Alagumuthukone born in  1729. After the death of his father in 1750, the same year Alagumuthukone was crowned king. In 1750, the British warned the  Kattalangulam and Ettayapuram Palayam to pay taxes. Alagumuthukone was furious with the report of the British. A consultative committee was held in Ettayapuram palace under the leadership of Jegaveerarama Ettappar, Chinna Alagumuthu Kone (his brother 1729–1755) and Alagumuthukone. In this, Alagumuthukone ordered that none of the villagers should pay taxes. He also sent a reply letter to the British government. It has been said that why should we pay taxes to the white man who came to do business in our country? He threatened that the heads of the British will roll on the soil of Kattalangulam if they come with the intention of collecting taxes. Shocked, the British government sent an English force to Kattalangulam in 1751. Alagumuthukon's soldiers who surrounded the British army that came to Kattalangulam cut down the British. With the help of chinna alagumuthukone kone, Alagumuthukone fought many battles against the British.

In 1755,the  Alagumuthukone, the war force of Alagumuthukone along with the Travancore force fought against Colonel Eron Keran's army and won. Alagumuthu kone was defeated in battle against the British and Maruthanayagam's forces in 1759. By Maruthanayaka's maneuver, Alagumuthukone stood smiling in front of the cannons and was blasted by the cannon and shattered into thousands of pieces.

Legacy 
In his memory, the government of Tamil Nadu conducts a Pooja ceremony every year on 11 July. A documentary film based on his life was released in 2012.

As a tribute to Kone, the Government of India released a Postage Stamp featuring him on 26 December 2015.

References 

Indian rebels
1710 births
1759 deaths
People from Tirunelveli district
Indian revolutionaries
Indian independence activists from Tamil Nadu
Revolutionary movement for Indian independence
Polygar Wars
People from Tamil Nadu